Molecular Aspects of Medicine is a bimonthly peer-reviewed medical journal covering molecular medicine. It is published by Elsevier on behalf of the International Union of Biochemistry and Molecular Biology.

Abstracting and indexing
The journal is abstracted and indexed in:

Article categories
The journal publishes only invited review articles.

External links 
 

General medical journals
Elsevier academic journals
Hybrid open access journals